Junun is a 2015 album by the Israeli composer Shye Ben Tzur, the English composer Jonny Greenwood and the Indian ensemble the Rajasthan Express. It was produced by Greenwood and engineered and mixed by Nigel Godrich, the longtime producer for Greenwood's band Radiohead.

Greenwood first performed with Ben Tzur and his band in 2014. For Junun, they set up a recording studio in Mehrangarh Fort in Rajasthan, India, and hired only local musicians. The Rajasthan Express incorporated musicians from Qawwali, Muslim Roma and a brass section who had played in weddings and parades.

Ben Tzur wrote the songs, with Greenwood contributing guitar, bass, keyboards, ondes Martenot and programming. He wanted to use chords sparingly, and instead write using North Indian ragas. Greenwood and Godrich hoped to capture the "roughness" of music in India, rather than pursue the high fidelity of many world music recordings. The recording was the subject of a documentary by Paul Thomas Anderson, released in October 2015. 

Junun received generally positive reviews. The group supported Radiohead's 2018 Moon Shaped Pool tour, performing under the name Junun.

Background 
Israeli composer Shye Ben Tzur, who had been living in India for over a decade, was contacted by the Radiohead guitarist Jonny Greenwood, who admired his music. In 2014, Greenwood performed with Ben Tzur and his band. Greenwood described Ben Tzur's music as "quite celebratory, more like gospel music than anything—except that it's all done to a backing of Indian harmoniums and percussion". He described his role as "supportive" rather than "soloistic".

Recording 
Planning a recording project, Greenwood and Ben Tzur agreed on things they would not do; for example, Greenwood insisted they hire only musicians from Rajasthan, India, and only use string instruments native to the region. Ben Tzur, Greenwood and Radiohead producer Nigel Godrich set up a recording studio in Mehrangarh Fort in Rajasthan. They were joined by a group they named the Rajasthan Express, incorporating musicians from three musical traditions: Qawwali, Sufi musicians from Southeast Asia; Muslim Roma; and a brass section who had played in weddings and parades. Ben Tzur wrote the songs, with Greenwood contributing guitar, bass, keyboards, ondes Martenot and programming. Greenwood produced the album and Godrich engineered.

According to Pitchfork, Junun incorporates "Bollywood-style brass exuberance, the devotional Qawwali music of Sufi Islam, and bowed-string instruments associated with the Manganiar community". Whereas western music is based on harmonies and chord progressions, Greenwood wanted to use chords sparingly, and instead write using North Indian ragas. He said: "There's no major or minor in Indian music, which is very peculiar for someone who's used to playing with Radiohead and coming up with chord sequences ... As soon as you start imposing chords on this kind of music, you pin it down and force melodies onto it to have some sort of harmonic language that they don't really have, [Indian] music is more ambiguous than that." He likened the music to the work of James Brown, describing it as "ecstatic".

Greenwood and Godrich said they wanted to avoid the "obsession" with high fidelity in recording world music, and instead capture the "dirt" and "roughness" of music in India. Greenwood said: "When lots of westerners go to India they make music with lots of respect, but sometimes it feels a bit like there's too much respect. People can be too wary, too wary to make anything that captures the real roughness of some of this music, especially the way the brass bands play when they're following processions and weddings down backstreets and the like." To capture less polished recordings, the singers used handheld microphones. The lyrics are in Hebrew, Hindi, and Urdu. Some singers sang phonetically in languages they did not know. All the reverb is natural and was recorded using a large space beneath the fort.

The recording is the subject of a documentary, Junun, by Paul Thomas Anderson, released in October 2015. Greenwood had previously composed soundtracks for several Anderson films. The group supported Radiohead's 2018 Moon Shaped Pool tour, performing under the name Junun.

Critical reception 

Junun received generally positive reviews. At the review aggregation site Metacritic, it has an average score of 79, based on 10 reviews, indicating "generally favourable reviews". Aggregator AnyDecentMusic? gave the album a 7.6 out of 10, based on their assessment of the critical consensus.

Pitchfork wrote: "The ensemble's playing and [Ben Tzur's] compositions make Junun an easy stretch—though, crucially, not a condescending one—for listeners otherwise unfamiliar with the great variety of methods often obscured by 'world music' market-speak." The Guardian wrote: "Greenwood contributes subtle embellishments – occasional electronic beats, as well as understated guitar and bass – rather than any scene-stealing showboating. Indeed, the real stars here are the Rajasthan Express's six-piece brass section."

Track listing
 "Junun" – 5:54
 "Roked" – 3:21
 "Hu" – 7:49
 "Chala Vahi Des" – 4:16
 "Kalandar" – 8:50
 "Eloah" – 3:55
 "Julus" – 3:44
 "Allah Elohim" – 4:21
 "Ahuvi" – 5:08
 "Azov" – 3:50
 "Junun Brass" – 3:29
 "There Are Birds in the Echo Chamber" – 0:32
 "Modeh" – 5:35

Personnel 

 Shye Ben Tzur – vocal, guitar, flute
 Jonny Greenwood – guitar, bass guitar, drum machine and computers, ondes martenot, keyboard
 Aamir Bhiyani – lead trumpet
 Hazmat – tuba
 Ajaj Damami – trombone
 Sabir Damami – tuba
 Soheb Bhiyani – trumpet
 Bhanwaru Khan – tuba
 Zakir Ali Qawwal – Qawwali vocal, harmonium
 Zaki Ali Qawwal – Qawwali vocal

 Gufran Ali, Shazib Ali – Qawwali chorus
 Ehtisham Khan Ajmer – Qawwali chorus, dholak
 Chugge Khan  – percussion (khartal, bhapang, manjeera)
 Nihal Khan – dholak
 Nathu Lal Solanki – nagara
 Narsi Lal Solanki – nagara
 Asin Khan – sarangi on "Hu", vocal on "Ahuvi"
 Dara Khan – kamaicha on "Hu" and "Ahuvi"
 Afshana Khan – vocal on "Chala Vahi Des"
 Razia Sultan – vocal on "Chala Vahi Des," "Allah Elohim"
 Nigel Godrich – mixing and engineering

References

2015 albums
Jonny Greenwood albums
Albums produced by Nigel Godrich
Hindi-language albums
Urdu-language albums
Hebrew-language albums
Albums recorded in India